These are the official results of the Men's 4×100 metres relay event at the 2001 IAAF World Championships in Edmonton, Alberta, Canada. Their final was held on Sunday 12 August 2001 at 17:10.

Records

Final

Semifinals
Held on Sunday 12 August 2001

Heat 1

Heat 2

Heats
Held on Saturday 11 August 2001

Heat 1

Heat 2

Heat 3

Heat 4

References
 Results

Relay 100 Men
Relays at the World Athletics Championships
4 × 100 metres relay